Sydney Parade Avenue Sandymount, Dublin 4, Ireland runs from the land formerly known as Ailesbury Park opposite the Merrion Centre at the Merrion Road end, to the sea of Dublin Bay at the Strand Road. Ailesbury Road joins Sydney Parade at the  DART station known as Sydney Parade railway station, originally opened in January 1835. Other side roads off the avenue include

 Richelieu Park, a cul-de-sac
 Ailesbury Park,
 Ailesbury Gardens, which joins with
 St. Alban's Park, and
 Park Avenue, the road to Sandymount village.

The Ailesbury Park end of the avenue has been closed to road traffic, since the 1980s. The avenue was formerly spelt Sidney Parade Avenue.

Literary connection
In "A Painful Case" by James Joyce, Mr. and Mrs. Sinico lived in a house called Leoville on Sydney Parade Avenue.

See also
List of streets and squares in Dublin

References

Streets in Dublin (city)